Yoon Jin-yi (born Kim Yoon-jin on July 27, 1990) is a South Korean actress.

Career
Yoon debuted in the 2012 romantic comedy TV series A Gentleman's Dignity, playing a girl in love with an older man.

In March 2019, Yoon signed with new agency HB Entertainment.

In March 2021, Yoon signed with Management Redwoods after her contract with HB expired.

Personal life 
On August 25, 2022, it was announced that Yoon is getting married with her non-celebrity boyfriend on October 22. The private wedding was held on October 22, 2022 in Bukchon Hanok Village.

Filmography

Film

Television series

Music videos

Awards and nominations

References

External links

South Korean television actresses
South Korean film actresses
1990 births
Living people
People from Daejeon
Sejong University alumni
King Kong by Starship artists